Radio America is an American radio network specializing in conservative-oriented talk programming. A division of the American Studies Center, the network describes its mission as "to produce and syndicate quality radio programs reflecting a commitment to traditional American values, limited government and the free market." The American Studies Center has funded special broadcast projects at Radio America, such as a documentary series on African American conservatives, and conservative programming like The Alan Keyes Show; What's the Story? With Fred Barnes; Common Sense Radio with Oliver North; Bob Barr's Laws of the Universe; Veterans Chronicles with Gene Pell; The G. Gordon Liddy Show; The Greg Knapp Experience; and Dateline Washington with Greg Corombos.

The network currently broadcasts a mix of general interest programming, including Doug Stephan and conservative talk host Chad Benson, during the week, and a variety of  weekend talk shows on various topics (such as The Money Pit and The Pet Show with Warren Eckstein. 

Radio America weekday programming airs on over 600 radio stations nationwide.

History
Radio America was founded in 1985 by its current president, James C. Roberts. In 1997, it achieved full network status, broadcasting 24 hours a day, seven days a week. Currently, Radio America distributes 15 hours of new programming each weekday. Throughout its existence, Radio America has been producing news, talk, documentary and short-features programming that has been picked up by stations around the nation.

Radio America programming is delivered to radio stations via satellite. Weekdays feature mainly news and political talk shows, while weekends offer specialty programs ranging from home finance and sports to medical advice and politics.

Radio America has a sister organization, the American Veterans Center, which is also funded by the American Studies Center.

Awards 
In 1994, Radio America produced The Blues Story: Triumph of An American Musical Art Form, a six-part radio documentary that won a Keeping the Blues Alive Award from the Blues Foundation.

The network has won a host of other awards, including the New York International Radio Festival's Gold and Silver medals, the ABA Silver Gavel, Gabriel, Ohio State, and Freedom Foundation.

References

External links
Radio America's Official Website
Radio America Programming Schedule
Radio America YouTube Channel
American Veterans Center (R.A.'s Sister Organization)
National Memorial Day Parade (A project of the American Studies Center)

American radio networks
Conservative talk radio
1985 establishments in the United States